Opal Luna Saturnyne is a fictional character appearing in American comic books published by Marvel Comics. The character was created by Dave Thorpe and Alan Davis for their Captain Britain stories.  Formerly the servant of Roma, she is currently the Omniversal Majestrix and rightful Ruler of Otherworld, charged with the safety of the Omniverse.

Her first appearance was in Marvel Superheroes #381 playing a major part in Alan Moore and Alan Davis' Jaspers' Warp storyline. She later had a recurring role in the pages of Excalibur.

Fictional character biography
Saturnyne originally hails from Earth 9, one in a myriad of alternative universes. She is a highly intelligent and ambitious woman and ends up on Otherworld as the Omniversal Majestrix.  In this role she is part of the Dimensional Development Court, overseeing the Captain Britain Corps and charged with the safekeeping and maintenance of order and reality of the entire Omniverse. Saturnyne reports to Merlyn, the Omniversal Guardian. Saturnyne feels no moral or ethical conflict in sacrificing anybody, even an entire universe, if it means the preservation of the Omniverse.

Whenever she decides to take a more personal interest in a matter, she calls upon the Avant Guard. The Avant Guard appear to be normal men, dressed in business suits and carrying an umbrella, but these umbrellas are in fact highly advanced weapons, capable of various abilities like interdimensional travel, destructive blasts and rays capable of devolving opponents. She is assisted by Dimples, an overweight man who loves Saturnyne deeply. Saturnyne herself cares little for Dimples and sees him only as a useful servant.

Saturnyne first came into contact with Brian Braddock, also known as Captain Britain, on the alternate Earth known as the Crooked World. This Earth is deemed to be a threat to the Omniverse and Saturnyne convinces Captain Britain to help evolve the backwards planet, hoping to eliminate its threat. They are opposed by the Status Crew, a group charged with maintaining the status quo. Saturnyne and Captain Britain manage to evolve the world, but are surprised when a bigger threat take its place: an alternate reality Mad Jim Jaspers uses his powers to create the Jaspers' Warp, causing widespread insanity and the collapse of reality. Captain Britain and Saturnyne want to stop him, but are stopped by the Fury, a killer machine. Saturnyne flees with her Avant Guard, leaving a heartbroken Dimples, Captain Britain and his sidekick Jackdaw behind. All three are killed by the Fury, shortly thereafter.

The Dimensional Development Court arrest Saturnyne and replace her with a man called Mandragon, who destroys the Earth 238 universe to prevent the Jaspers Warp from spreading. Merlyn resurrects Captain Britain (but not Jackdaw), and the Fury manages to escape under his own power. Captain Britain and the interdimensional mercenaries known as the Special Executive help Saturnyne escape from the Court to Earth-616. On Earth-616, Mad Jim Jaspers, an even more powerful version than the one on Earth 238, comes into power and threatens the world. The Fury also makes its way to Earth-616 and  battles Jaspers. During the conflict, Merlyn dies (though later he would reveal that he had just faked his death). In the end the Fury kills Jaspers and is killed shortly afterwards by Captain Britain and Captain UK from Earth 238, with help from Saturnyne and the Special Executive. Saturnyne manages to obtain cell samples of Jaspers and threatens to unleash a clone on Mandragon's world if he does not return her former position to her. Merlyn's daughter Roma succeeds her father, and Saturnyne becomes an agent of Roma.

Despite having cooperated with Captain Britain at various times, she comes into conflict with Captain Britain when she sends the bounty-hunters known as the Technet after Phoenix. The Technet fail to capture her and Phoenix joins Captain Britain, Shadowcat, Meggan and Nightcrawler to form Excalibur. Saturnyne later meets Phoenix in person, but does not capture her. Saturnyne rescinds her warrant against Phoenix but indefinitely extends the Technet's exile on Earth. She also delivers a message from Roma asking the other Captain Britains to free Excalibur's Captain Britain. Later events reveal that Saturnyne was acting under Roma's orders when she originally sent the Technet against Phoenix, and that the Technet was meant to fail, resulting in the formation of Excalibur.

Saturnyne remains Roma's servant and Omniversal Majestrix for the following years until the villain Mastermind destroys the Captain Britain Corps and imprisons Roma before being defeated by Captain Britain. Saturnyne returns as Omniversal Majestrix, but has a bitter relationship with Brian, newly appointed ruler of Otherworld, whom she deems unworthy of his new position. She is summoned by Roma when the annihilistic cosmic entity Abraxas tries to destroy creation. While Roma is killed, Saturnyne shields Franklin and Valeria Richards from him.

Saturnyne appears in a House of M tie-in story in Uncanny X-Men #462-465, which includes many classic Marvel UK characters. During X-Men: Die by the Sword, she blasts the resurrected Mad Jim Jaspers with a massive energy-weapon; Jaspers however pulls himself together again and threatens to kill her before members of the Exiles distracts him, allowing her to escape.

During the Spider-Verse storyline, Saturnyne and Lady Roma express their concerns about the Incursions that are destroying many dimensions as Spider-UK arrives to express his concern about all the spiders across the multiverse being hunted and killed. Saturnyne rebuffs him, but Roma sympathizes with him and gives him a talisman that allows him to travel through the web of life in order to save all the remaining spiders.

Ultimately, Saturnyne is forced to confront the growing threat of the Incursions when the destruction of the various universes leads to the deaths of many members of the Captain Britain Corps. Saturnyne captures a Map Maker and attempts to use it to determine the cause of the Incursions. This instead brings forth an army of Map Maker robots which slaughter the Captain Britain Corps, Roma, and ultimately Saturnyne. Her last act is to place the secrets of the Starlight Citadel into the 616 Captain Britain's brain so that he can warn the Illuminati.

As of the 2019 series Excalibur (v4), Saturnyne has been restored to life and is now referred to by some characters as the White Witch, and has gained a new enemy, the ancient mutant Apocalypse/En Sabah Nur. It is also stated that she has replaced Roma Regina as the Omniversal Guardian, but remains referred to as the Omniveral Majestrix by her minions.

Characterization
According to Alan Davis, Dave Thorpe's original script had specified Saturnyne's appearance to be based on American actress Veronica Lake. Davis has explained that Saturnyne "enjoys power, and she's a bit of an ice princess, which is why she's silver and blue, with a cold appearance". The Official Handbook of the Marvel Universe A-Z of 2008/09 describes Saturnyne as having a Machiavellian mind and being a cunning strategist, and while not being outright brilliant (listed as a three on a scale of seven in intelligence), her indomitable strength of will and ambition has allowed her to ascend to her lofty position through hard work without being born into it.

Other versions
Saturnyne has counterparts on many worlds. The most important among these are:

Courtney Ross

Courtney Ross is a fictional character appearing in American comic books published by Marvel Comics. The character originated in the Captain Britain comics as Brian Braddock's college girlfriend, and was created by Chris Claremont and drawn by artists Herb Trimpe and Fred Kida. Later she was murdered and impersonated by her multiversal counterpart Sat-Yr-9, a twisted version of Saturnyne; it has remained ambiguous whether Courtney has actually returned at all since her death or been Sat-Yr-9 all along.

Courtney Ross came from a wealthy family and went to Thames University, London, where she met and started to date Brian Braddock, not knowing that Brian was in fact the superhero Captain Britain. She later found out about his secret life, but the two remained lovers. Captain Britain went missing shortly afterwards and Courtney assumed that he had died. When he returned, Brian fell in love with the mutant Meggan and it would be years before he would meet Courtney again.

Courtney met Brian Braddock again, when he had become a member of Excalibur. She had become a successful city banker nicknamed The Ice Queen. She now no longer dyed her hair, and Brian was surprised that Courtney with blond hair looked exactly like his old acquaintance Saturnyne, her counterpart from another universe.

Brian and Courtney resumed their friendship, shortly before she was attacked by Arcade and the Crazy Gang. Confronted in her offices, she manages to fight through the Crazy Gang's forces and escape the building, but Arcade, hiding in a fake police car, captures her and takes her to a new Murderworld. There she was forced to improvise comedy in order to survive, surprising both herself and Arcade by being sufficiently entertaining to survive until she was rescued by Excalibur. Returning home after surviving Arcade's assassination attempt and enjoying the thrill of danger, she was vaporized by another counterpart from an alternate universe, Opul Lun Sat-Yr-9.

Sat-Yr-9
Opul Lun Sat-Yr-9 was the dictator of Earth-794, along with her lover Kaptain Briton. As a child, Sat-Yr-9 exhibited psychopathic behavior such as killing animals for amusement and later killed her parents and siblings at the age of 18, always dreaming about becoming Mastrex of the dictatorship True Briton. Her political rivals followed the same fate until she had achieved her goals. Unlike Saturnyne and Courtney, Sat-Yr-9 possesses mind-control abilities possibly derived from pheromone manipulation and hypnosis skills. A similar counterpart exists on Earth-1124, where she is visited by the Deathlok of Earth-7484 and the Killraven of Earth-691, attempting to seduce and offering herself to Killraven, although he ultimately resists her and returns to Earth X. When Kaptain Briton flees to Earth-616, where he has an identical looking counterpart, Captain Britain, Sat-Yr-9 sends armored troops to retrieve him. They mistakenly attack Captain Britain twice, but are repelled on each occasion. Sat-Yr-9 hires the interdimensional mercenary group, the Technet, but Briton swaps places with Britain, and the Technet take the wrong man back to Earth-794. Britain later convinces the Technet of their error.  When Sat-Yr-9 tries to stop them departing with Britain, the Technet slaughter her soldiers; the already psychotic Sat-Yr-9 becomes completely unhinged. She kills her subjects, leading Roma to send Captain UK on a mission to overthrow and imprison her. Later, Sat-Yr-9 seizes the opportunity to escape when an unassuming dimensional traveller from Earth-616 inadvertently enters her cell; she kills him, steals his suit and exits through the portal he came through.

After murdering Courtney on Earth-616, Sat-Yr-9 takes on her identity. Sat-Yr-9 knew about Jamie Braddock's reality warping powers before anyone else (including Jamie himself), since she has already encountered Jamie's alternate reality counterpart. Sat-Yr-9 challenges Ross's coworker (and secret admirer) Nigel Frobisher to a high-stakes card game at the London Hellfire Club, and wins. Frobisher agrees to serve her, and she orders him to rescue the Earth-616 Jamie Braddock from Doc Croc, intending to use his powers as a living weapon against her adversaries. Sat-Yr-9 takes Kitty Pryde under her guidance, enrolling Kitty in the St. Searle's School for Young Ladies, and arranges a deal to save St. Searle's from bankruptcy. Sat-Yr-9 later unmasks herself, revealing to Brian that she murdered Courtney and has taken her place; he swears revenge on the impostor for the crime as she and Jamie leaves.

Still posing as the Earth-616's Courtney Ross, she has joined the Hellfire Club as its White Queen, with Viper, a former HYDRA assassin, as her self-proclaimed "White Princess" and bodyguard. Someone claiming to be Courtney Ross has been seen in issues of Uncanny X-Men during the House of M crossover, as well as in the early issues of New Excalibur. Upon meeting Captain Britain during the House of M event, she was attacked and was accused of being her impostor, Sat-Yr-9, but upon revealing that she did not possess a tattoo on her thigh, was believed to be the true Courtney Ross (possibly resurrected as a side-effect of House of M). The Official Handbook of the Marvel Universe does not confirm if this was the true Courtney Ross, resurrected, or Sat-Yr-9 continuing to pose as her. She is then shown sacrificing herself to save Captain Britain from an attack by the Omega Sentinel. After the events of House of M, Sat-Yr-9 returns. She tries to convince Captain Britain that she is the real Courtney Ross, although he is still unconvinced. Later on, he has warmed up to the idea of Courtney actually being herself again, referring to her as Courtney and confiding in her.

Sat'neen
Sat'neen is a princess and sorceress from Earth 148, lover of Kylun, killed by Necrom.

Queen Mother
Queen of England in Earth-1193, a world filled with magic and mystical creatures, who coexist with humans. She is described by Brian Braddock as an "older and kinder" version of Saturnyne.

References
Primary

Secondary

External links
UXM entry on Saturnyne
 

Characters created by Alan Davis
Characters created by Chris Claremont
Comics characters introduced in 1976
Comics characters introduced in 1982
Fictional bankers
Fictional characters from parallel universes
Fictional English people
Fictional female businesspeople
Fictional impostors
Fictional members of secret societies
Fictional queens
Marvel Comics female characters
Marvel UK characters